The United Arab Emirates Sevens team is new to the sevens scene. They previously formed the Arabian Gulf sevens team along with Bahrain, Kuwait, Oman, Qatar, Saudi Arabia as part of the Arabian Gulf Rugby Football Union before the IRB disbanded the union.

The 2011 Dubai Sevens will be their debut as a national team.

Current squad
12 Men squad to 2011 Dubai Sevens:
Tim Fletcher
Murray Strang
Shane Rutherford
Brad Barker
Adam V Robinson 
Emad Reyal
Mohammed Rahma
Sean Hurley
Chris Gregory
Steve Smith
Cyrus Homayoun
Stefan Imbert
David Matasio
2015-2016 Men's Squad:
 Niall Statham
 Andrew Carphin
 Christopher Marshall
 Munier Kenny
 Ryno Fourie
 Devante Steele
 Imad Reyal
 Charlie Sargent
 Hassan Al Noobi
 Ian Overton
 Mohammad Hassan
 Adel Al Hendi
 Jerry Baleilautoka
 Tuharangi Kahukuranui

Results

2011
2011 Dubai Sevens

References

National rugby sevens teams
Rugby union in the United Arab Emirates